Tse Chi Lop (born 1963) is the alleged kingpin behind Asia-Pacific based international crime supersyndicate Sam Gor, also referred to as "The Company", and former member of the Hong Kong, Toronto and Vancouver-based triad crime group the Big Circle Gang. Aliases used by Tse include Tse Chi Lap, Brother No. 3, Sam Gor, T1, Ah Lap, Dennis and Xie Zii. Some police forces refer to Tse as "T1" (top target). A Reuters report in 2019 stated that Tse was a "Canadian national" but did not specify the location of his residence; as of June 2020, he held a Canadian passport. At that time he was said to be 56 years old.

The Sam Gor syndicate generates billions of dollars each year from the trade in methamphetamine and other synthetic drugs. The United Nations Office on Drugs and Crime estimated that Sam Gor generated between $8 billion and $17.7 billion in revenue from meth in 2018 had "expanded at least fourfold in the past five years". Some leading authorities asserted that Tse is as big of a  player in the global drug trade as Mexican drug lord Joaquín "El Chapo" Guzmán. Sam Gor is said to be largely responsible for the dramatic shift in recent years away from drugs such as heroin and towards synthetics such as methamphetamine, ketamine and fentanyl in East and Southeast Asia, and has been implicated in very large shipments outside the immediate region including a 1.2 ton seizure of methamphetamine in Geraldton, Western Australia in 2017. The group's methamphetamine production operations in the Golden Triangle area of Myanmar are "protected by private militias" according to a June 2020 news report. The group is believed to source and sell a range of drugs and precursor chemicals from a variety of sources and countries.

Tse was arrested by Dutch police in Schiphol Airport on 22 January 2021 when he was on his way to Canada from Taiwan. He was extradited to Melbourne, Australia on 22 December 2022.

Early life
Born in Guangzhou, China, moved to Hong Kong before handover. Tse immigrated to Canada in 1988, living in Toronto.

In Toronto, he was part of the Big Circle Boys, a faction of the Big Circle Gang, which was originally formed by imprisoned members of Mao's Red Guard during the 1960s Cultural Revolution in China. In 1998, Tse was convicted of transporting heroin through Canada into the United States in partnership with the Rizzuto crime family which was the dominant North American Italian mafia family at the time. Tse served nine years behind bars with fellow big circle boys associates, Wai dai Cheung and Chung wai hung. Tse has been compared in prominence to Joaquín "El Chapo" Guzmán and Pablo Escobar. Tse has been wanted for years and subject to an Interpol notice since 2019 after he was named publicly. Tse was arrested en route to Canada from Taiwan during a stop over in Amsterdam on 22 January 2021. The Australian Federal Police (AFP) is seeking his extradition from the Netherlands to face trial. The arrest was the culmination of multi-year Operation Kungur, led by the AFP and supported in different ways by twenty law enforcement agencies with interests in the case including from Canada, China, Hong Kong SAR, Japan, Macau SAR, Myanmar, New Zealand, Thailand, and the US (including the DEA). Taiwan's Ministry of Justice Investigation Bureau assisted. It remains unclear how he was able to live without detection or arrest in Taiwan after being publicly named in 2019. Raising concerns about the influence of organized crime in the region after the arrest, UNODC commenting that "It's a great result...[b]ut the organisation remains...while taking down syndicate leadership matters, the conditions they have effectively used in the region to do business remain unaddressed, and the network remains in-place. The demand for synthetic drugs has been built, and someone will step in to replace Tse."

Activity
In 1998, Tse pleaded guilty to a one charge of conspiracy to import heroin into the United States, serving  six years of a nine-year sentence at Federal Correctional Institution, Elkton. It is also said he was involved with the Rizzuto crime family at the time. Following his release, Tse was able to rise to power in a few short years by creating a triad alliance while effectively maintaining his anonymity and enjoying life in Hong Kong and Macau. Sam Gor is made up of five members of different triads: the 14K Triad, Wo Shing Wo, Sun Yee On, Big Circle Gang and Bamboo Union. The group is associated and does business with many other local crime groups such as the Yakuza in Japan, the Satudarah Motorcycle Club and the Comanchero Motorcycle Club and Lebanese and other mafias in Australia, and is responsible for what is thought to be the biggest drug-trafficking operation in Asia's history.

Arrest and extradition
Tse had been wanted for years and subject to an Interpol notice since 2019 after he was named publicly. Tse was arrested en route to Canada from Taiwan during a stopover in Amsterdam's Schiphol Airport on 22 January 2021. The Australian Federal Police (AFP) is seeking his extradition from the Netherlands to face trial. The arrest was the culmination of Operation Kungur, led by the AFP and supported by roughly twenty law enforcement agencies in Canada, China, Japan, Myanmar, Thailand, and the US (including the DEA) Taiwan's Ministry of Justice Investigation Bureau assisted. It remains unclear how he was able to live without detection or arrest in Taiwan after being publicly named in 2019. Raising concerns about the influence of organized crime in the region after the arrest, UNODC Regional Representative Jeremy Douglas commented "It’s a great result...[b]ut the organisation remains". He added, "...while taking down syndicate leadership matters, the conditions they have effectively used in the region to do business remain unaddressed, and the network remains in-place. The demand for synthetic drugs has been built, and someone will step in to replace Tse."

In July 2021 a Dutch court approved an order to extradite Lop to Australia to face trial. He was eventually extradited in December 2022 to face charges in Australia.

In popular culture 
In November 2021 Discovery released a documentary on Lop titled The World's Biggest Druglord – Tse Chi Lop on Discovery+ as well as on its linear channels in South East Asia, Taiwan, Japan, Australia, and New Zealand.

References 

Living people
Chinese gangsters
Canadian gangsters
Chinese crime bosses
Canadian crime bosses
Triad members
Chinese emigrants to Canada
People from Guangzhou
1963 births